Clara Mannes (born Clara Damrosch; 12 December 1869, Breslau, Silesia – 16 March 1948, New York City) was a German-born American musician and music educator. She and her brother Frank Damrosch also taught at the Veltin School for Girls in Manhattan. With her husband, David Mannes, she founded the David Mannes Music School in 1916, now known as the Mannes School of Music at the New School.

Mannes was born in Breslau. Her mother, Helene von Heimburg, was a former opera singer, and her father was conductor Leopold Damrosch. Her siblings were conductors Frank Damrosch and Walter Damrosch. Her parents were Lutheran (her paternal grandfather was Jewish).

Her children were musician Leopold Mannes and author Marya Mannes.

References

External links 

 

1869 births
1948 deaths
German women musicians
American women musicians
American music educators
American people of German-Jewish descent
German emigrants to the United States
Musicians from Wrocław